Allan Hills is an unincorporated community in Lost River Rural Municipality No. 313, Saskatchewan, Canada. The community is located on Highway 764, 12 km south of the town of Allan in the heart of the Allan Hills.

History 
The Allan Hills Post office was located at Sec 22 Twp 31 R1 W3 from July 1, 1919, to closing on Dec 31, 1951. Another post office was open for a short time from August 1, 1914, to April 1, 1918, on Sec 15 in the same Township.

See also 
 List of communities in Saskatchewan

References 

Ghost towns in Saskatchewan
Lost River No. 313, Saskatchewan
Populated places established in 1919
Unincorporated communities in Saskatchewan